Her Name Was Lisa is a 1979 American pornographic film directed by Roger Watkins under the pseudonym Richard Mahler.

Plot 
At the funeral of a young woman named Lisa (Samantha Fox), several people who influenced her life in the time leading up to her death begin to have flashbacks. Paul (Rick Iverson) meets Lisa in a brothel, and offers her money to pose for some nude photographs, which she accepts. After a few sessions, Paul introduces Lisa to Stephen Sweet (David Pierce), who provides Lisa with money, drugs, and an apartment in return for sexual favours. Initially, Stephen and Lisa participate in consensual BDSM sessions, but eventually this escalates into him hiring two men to rape Lisa in front of him. Behind Stephen's back, Lisa begins a sexual relationship with Carmen (Vanessa del Rio). Together, Lisa and Carmen get revenge on Stephen by sodomising him with a strap-on dildo. Finding that she's developed a tolerance to the drugs Stephen gave her, Lisa is introduced to heroin by Carmen. While under the influence, Lisa has sex with a couple, only to break down in tears in front of a mirror. Lisa comes to Carmen for more heroin, which she gives her in return for a kiss. Carmen offers to let Lisa administer her own dose, which results in her death by overdose.

Cast

Production 
Watkins claimed that he refused to direct the sex scenes for the film, although he changed his stance later in his career after being disappointed with the sex scenes in Lisa. The character Stephen Sweet seems to be named after Steve Sweet, who starred in Watkins' 1977 film Last House on Dead End Street.

Release 
The film was released on Blu-ray by Vinegar Syndrome on May 29, 2018.

Reception 
Her Name Was Lisa has been generally well received. Writing for Blu-ray.com, Brian Orndorf was mixed on the film, saying the film "[wins] points for a decidedly morose tone... but here, [Watkins] just comes off as angry, bothered that sexual activity is interfering with his display of rage". In 1999, the film was inducted into the XRCO Hall of Fame.

References

External links 

 
 
 

1979 films
American pornographic films
Films directed by Roger Watkins
1970s English-language films
1970s American films